Tetrabromoethylene is a brominated derivative of ethylene.  It can be produced by oxybrominating butane with free oxygen and bromine.

See also
 Tetrachloroethylene
 Tetrafluoroethylene
 Tetrabromoethane

References

Organobromides
Alkene derivatives